The National Engineering Forum (NEF) is an American movement based on the idea that the U.S. engineering enterprise fuels national security and economic prosperity, but that the nation’s engineers face a series of challenges threatening their profession’s sustainability. The movement is aimed at finding solutions to those challenges, identified by NEF as the 3C’s - capacity, capability and competitiveness:

 the capacity of technical talent to fill future jobs 
 the engineering workforce’s capability to address 21st century challenges, and 
 competitiveness in a global economy

Currently, NEF spotlights American engineers and the 3C’s via its newsletter and website, and acclaims engineering advancements on Twitter.

History 
In 2012, Lockheed Martin launched the National Engineering Forum, and then engaged the Council on Competitiveness and the National Academy of Engineering, which share a common vision for transforming the way we perceive, experience, and prioritize engineering in this country. NEF's initial focus included a five-year regional dialogue tour of key engineering hubs throughout the nation, including: New York; Knoxville, Tennessee; Albuquerque, New Mexico; Los Angeles; Columbus, Ohio; Houston; San Diego; Seattle; Detroit; Raleigh-Durham, North Carolina; Pittsburgh; Chicago; Boston; Atlanta; Phoenix; Madison, Wisconsin; Orlando, Florida; Stillwater, Oklahoma and Greenville, South Carolina.

In addition to sharing engineering news and features in its regular newsletter, in 2014 NEF released a report entitled Engineering our Nation's Future.

References 
 Building Bridges and Making a Difference Fluid Power Journal (Sept. 21, 2017)
 Engineer’s Dream Has Wings Fluid Power Journal (May 18, 2017)
 A Conversation with Jennifer George Fluid Power Journal (Feb. 23, 2017)
 Building the Future Fluid Power Journal (Jan. 19, 2017)
 Clemson Elevates Engineering, Brings National Engineering Forum to South Carolina Fluid Power Journal (June 16, 2016)
 Problem solved? Not yet for America’s engineers Georgia Engineer (Feb. 22, 2016)
 National Engineering Forum Convenes Leaders in Orlando, Florida Fluid Power Journal (Feb. 1, 2016)
 UCF Hosts National Engineering Forum Regional Dialogue UCF Today (Nov. 10, 2015)
 Industry leaders discuss the future of engineering Arizona State University News (Feb. 20, 2015)
 National Engineering Forum Works To Hike Awareness, Attract Talent Aerospace Daily and Defense Report (Dec. 29, 2014)
 Midwest engineering leaders converge at Illinois-sponsored NEF regional event University of Illinois News (Dec. 18, 2014)
 National Engineering Forum Addresses Engineering’s Three Biggest Challenges engineering.com (Dec. 5, 2014)
 The Future of U.S. Engineering: Framing a National Agenda IndustryTap.com (June 25, 2014)
 National Engineering Forum highlights need for engineers The Eagle, Allen Reed (Nov. 13, 2013)

External links 
 
 

Engineering organizations